The 2009 Terek Grozny season was the second successive season that the club played in the Russian Premier League, the highest tier of football in Russia, in which they finished 12th. They also took part in the 2009–10 Russian Cup, reaching the Round of 32 where they were defeated by Mordovia Saransk.

Squad

On loan

Left club during season

Transfers

In

Loans in

Out

Loans out

Released

Competitions

Russian Premier League

Results by round

Results

League table

Russian Cup

Squad statistics

Appearances and goals

|-
|colspan="10"|Players away on loan:

|-
|colspan="10"|Players who appeared for Terek Grozny but left during the season:

|}

Goal Scorers

Disciplinary record

References

FC Akhmat Grozny seasons
Terek Grozny